David Ketchum (born February 4, 1928, in Quincy, Illinois) is an American character actor, writer, and director perhaps most noted for playing Agent 13 on the 1960s sitcom Get Smart. 

Ketchum studied physics at UCLA and joined other UCLA students in entertaining military personnel around the world for the USO.

Ketchum had a radio program for seven years in San Diego, California. On television, he portrayed Counselor Spiffy in Camp Runamuck. He was also a regular on I'm Dickens, He's Fenster, playing the role of Mel Warshaw. 

Agent 13 was often seen in recurring jokes on the show hiding in unusual places such as mailboxes or fire hydrants. Ketchum reprised the role in the 1989 TV movie Get Smart Again as well as an episode of 1995 revival of Get Smart on Fox. Ketchum also co-wrote one episode of the third season of the original series, titled "Classification: Dead." He also wrote scripts for other programs, including The Andy Griffith Show and Petticoat Junction.

In 1962, his comedy album The Long-Playing Tongue of Dave Ketchum was released. Billboard gave it a 4-star prefix for strong sales potential.

Films in which Ketchum appeared included Young Doctors in Love (1982) and The Other Sister (1999).

Ketchum married singer Louise Bryant.

References

External links
 
 

1928 births
Living people
American male television actors
People from Quincy, Illinois
University of California, Los Angeles alumni
American male television writers
20th-century American male writers
20th-century American male actors